Clydesdale is an archaic name for Lanarkshire, a traditional county in Scotland. The name may also refer to:

Sports
 Clydesdale F.C., a former football club in Glasgow
 Clydesdale RFC, Glasgow, a former rugby union club
 Clydesdale RFC, South Lanarkshire, a rugby union club
 Clydesdale Cricket Club, a cricket club in Glasgow
 Clydesdale Harriers, an athletics club in Clydebank
 Clydesdale Amateur Rowing Club, a rowing club in Glasgow
 Toowoomba Clydesdales, an Australian rugby league team that takes its name from the horse breed

Animals
 Clydesdale horse, a breed of horse originating in the district of the same name
 Budweiser Clydesdales, a group of Clydesdale horses used in Anheuser-Busch promotions
 Paisley terrier, also known as the Clydesdale Terrier

Places
 Clydesdale, Nova Scotia, a community in Canada
 Clydesdale, KwaZulu-Natal, a town in Sisonke District Municipality in KwaZulu-Natal, South Africa

Businesses
 Clydesdale Bank
 Clydesdale (retailer), a defunct Scottish electrical retailer
 Clydesdale Junction Railway, former railway operator

Politics
 Clydesdale (Scottish Parliament constituency)
 Clydesdale (district), former government district in Strathclyde, Scotland (1975–1996)
 Clydesdale (UK Parliament constituency), a former constituency of the House of Commons
 Clydesdale, a current Synod of the Church of Scotland
 Used in the name of four wards of South Lanarkshire Council:
Clydesdale East (ward)
Clydesdale North (ward)
Clydesdale South (ward)
Clydesdale West (ward)

People
 Alec Clydesdale (1875–1947), Australian politician
 David T. Clydesdale (born 1954), American musician
 Marquess of Clydesdale, title of the eldest son of the Duke of Hamilton

Other uses
Clydesdale (1819 ship), built in Quebec, Canada
 The Clydesdale, an American alt country band
 Magnolia Dusty Clydesdale and  Col. T. R. Clydesdale, fictional characters in the film The Apple Dumpling Gang